John Fredy Márquinez (born March 5, 1988 in Barbacoas, Colombia) is a Colombian Association Football Forward currently playing for Estudiantes de Buenos Aires of the Primera B Metropolitana in Argentina.

Teams
  Curicó Unido 2007
  Universidad de Concepción 2008
  Fernández Vial 2008-2011
  Estudiantes de Buenos Aires 2011–present

References
 

1988 births
Living people
Colombian footballers
Colombian expatriate footballers
Curicó Unido footballers
C.D. Arturo Fernández Vial footballers
Universidad de Concepción footballers
Estudiantes de Buenos Aires footballers
Chilean Primera División players
Primera B de Chile players
Expatriate footballers in Chile
Expatriate footballers in Argentina
People from Barbacoas, Nariño
Association football forwards
Sportspeople from Nariño Department